is a Super NES video game released in 1994. It is the second game released based on the film of the same name, the other title being an adventure game for DOS, published by Capstone Software.

Gameplay 

The player must either fight or avoid cats and other obstacles as they stroll westward. The game is side-scrolling with a side-view of the action at nearly all times. The character is armed with a pop gun that can eliminate enemies using a non-violent approach to the Wild West genre.

Synopsis 

The storyline of the game is deep and takes place in 1890 AD. The game is about a 3-inch tall cartoon mouse named Fievel who must make his way to the 1870s-1900s Wild West. The setting is based on the film of the same name, released back in 1991.

Development and release

Reception 

An American Tail: Fievel Goes West was never reviewed by the Entertainment Software Rating Board ratings board, but was reviewed by Nintendo Power on its August 1994 issue. Spanish magazine Superjuegos gave the game a 93 out  of 100 score.

Notes

References

External links 
 An American Tail: Fievel Goes West at GameFAQs
 An American Tail: Fievel Goes West at Giant Bomb
 An American Tail: Fievel Goes West at MobyGames

1994 video games
Fiction set in 1890
Video games set in the 1890s
An American Tail (franchise)
Hudson Soft games
Super Nintendo Entertainment System games
Super Nintendo Entertainment System-only games
Video games about children
Video games about mice and rats
Video games based on films
Video games developed in Japan
Video games set in the United States
Western (genre) video games